Canrobert  Airfield was a World War II military airfield in Algeria, located approximately 4 km south of Oum el Bouaghi, approximately 70 km southeast of Constantine.  It was used by the United States Army Air Force Twelfth Air Force during the North African Campaign against the German Afrika Korps. The Allied commanders made desperate efforts to prepare forward airfields for the use of fighters and fighter-bombers. Canrobert was one of these intermediate fields.

Known Twelfth Air Force units assigned were:

 47th Bombardment Group, 6–30 March 1943, A-20 Havoc
 81st Bombardment Squadron, (12th Bombardment Group), 16 March-3 May 1943, B-25 Mitchell
 82d Bombardment Squadron, (12th Bombardment Group), 16 March-1 May 1943, B-25 Mitchell
 308th Fighter Squadron, (31st Fighter Squadron), 21–25 February 1943, Spitfire

When the Americans moved out in May 1943, the airfield was dismantled and abandoned.   Today agriculture has reclaimed the land where the airfield existed, however a faint outline of its main runway can be seen in aerial photography.

Notes

References

 Maurer, Maurer. Air Force Combat Units of World War II. Maxwell AFB, Alabama: Office of Air Force History, 1983. .
 5
 USAFHRA search for Canrobert Airfield
 Coggins, Jack. The campaign for North Africa. Doubleday, 1980. .

External links

Airfields of the United States Army Air Forces in Algeria
World War II airfields in Algeria
Airports established in 1943